Gidaya (Harari: ጊዳየ Gidayä), also known as Gedaya or Jidaya was a historical Muslim state located around present-day eastern Ethiopia. The state was positioned on the Harar plateau and a district of Adal region. It neighbored other states in the medieval era including Ifat, Hubat, Hargaya, Mora, Hadiya, and Fatagar.

History
According to Dr. Lapiso, Gidaya was one of the Islamic states that had developed in the Horn of Africa from the ninth to fourteenth centuries. The earliest mention of Gidaya state is during its conflict with the Makhzumi dynasty in 1266. In the thirteenth century the Arab writer al-Mufaḍḍal mentions the king of Gidaya was named Yûsuf ibn Arsamâyah. 

In 1285 Walasma dynasty crushed a rebellion led by Gidaya which allied with Shewa to revive the Makhzumi state. In the fourteenth century it was under the Ifat Sultanate and later the Adal Sultanate with its leader known as the Garad. 

In the sixteenth century the people of Gidaya were part of the army of Ahmad ibn Ibrahim al-Ghazi during the Ethiopian-Adal war. Ulrich Braukamper states Gidaya may be associated with Giri mentioned in the Futuh al Habasha who today are of dual Oromo and Somali ancestry living around Jigjiga, the presumed location of Gidaya state. 

The name Gidaya still exists as a surname in Harar, and according to researcher Mahdi Gadid, Gidaya state was primarily inhabited by Harari people before being assimilated by the Oromo and Somali people. According to Harari records Gidaya state collapsed due to the Oromo migrations and famine.

See also
 Jidwaq (clan)

References

Cities of the Adal Sultanate